The 16th Legislative Assembly of Ontario was in session from June 25, 1923, until October 18, 1926, just prior to the 1926 general election. The majority party was the Ontario Conservative Party led by George Howard Ferguson.

The United Farmers of Ontario party, who had held the balance of power in the preceding assembly, lost most of their seats to Conservatives.

The Liberals led by Wellington Hay were recognized as the Official Opposition following the 1923 election by the governing Conservatives, despite the fact that the United Farmers of Ontario had more seats.  According to historian Peter Oliver, this was an arbitrary decision without basis in precedent or law.  Conservative Premier G. Howard Ferguson used as justification an announcement by UFO general secretary James J. Morrison that the UFO would be withdrawing from party politics, though Oliver argues that this was facetious logic.  UFO parliamentary leader Manning Doherty protested the decision, but to no avail. In the course of the parliament, most UFO MLAs reorganized themselves as the Progressive Party under the leadership of first Manning Doherty and then William Raney, with only Beniah Bowman and Leslie Warner Oke continuing as UFO MLAs.

Joseph Elijah Thompson served as speaker for the assembly.

Members elected to the Assembly
Listing reflects the UFO/Progressive split in 1924. Italicized names indicate members returned by acclamation.

Timeline

External links 
Members in Parliament 16

References 

Terms of the Legislative Assembly of Ontario
1923 establishments in Ontario
1926 disestablishments in Ontario